Paul Morgan (3 October 1974 – 12 January 2015) was a Welsh professional rugby union and rugby league footballer, rugby union coach and cricketer, born in Pencoed.

Background
Paul Morgan was born in Pencoed, Bridgend, Wales, he was the Executive Director at All Sports Protection, having been a Sports Risk Consultant at brightsidegroup, National Manager at April-UK Sports Division, Director at Morgans Health & Fitness Centre, and Gyms Co-ordinator at Bridgend County Borough Council, he was survived by spouse Heidi and offspring Tyler, Harry, and Madison.

Playing career

International honours
Paul Morgan won caps for Wales (RL) while with Bridgend Blue Bulls in the 2005 European Nations Cup against Ireland (interchange/substitute), and France (interchange/substitute).

Club career
Paul Morgan made his début for Aberavon RFC, and scored two tries, against Walsall RFC at Talbot Athletic Ground on Sunday 20 August 2000, his last match for Aberavon RFC was against Neath RFC at The Gnoll on Wednesday 15 September 2004, he scored three tries for Bridgend Blue Bulls in the 60–10 victory over Leeds Akkies in the 2005 Harry Jepson Trophy at Brewery Field on Sunday 28 August 2005.

Later life 
He died On 12 January 2015 aged 40.

References

External links
Ireland v Wales (Sat)
Premier Wales R13 round-up
Duggan dominates Crusaders awards
France 38–16 Wales
Rugby League international Paul Morgan dies after short illness

1974 births
2015 deaths
Aberavon RFC players
Alumni of Brunel University London
Bridgend Blue Bulls players
Bridgend RFC players
Crusaders Rugby League players
Footballers who switched code
Llanharan RFC players
London Welsh RFC players
Maesteg RFC players
Neath Port Talbot Steelers players
Place of death missing
Rugby league centres
Rugby league players from Bridgend County Borough
Rugby league wingers
Rugby union centres
Rugby union players from Pencoed
Wales national rugby league team players
Welsh rugby league players
Welsh rugby union players